Zora hespera is a species of prowling spider in the family Miturgidae. It is found in the United States and Canada.

References

Miturgidae
Articles created by Qbugbot
Spiders described in 1991